The 2010 Fareham Council election took place on 6 May 2010 to elect members of Fareham Borough Council in Hampshire, England. Half of the council was up for election and the Conservative Party stayed in overall control of the council.

After the election, the composition of the council was:
Conservative 22
Liberal Democrat 9

Election result
The election saw the Conservatives retain control of the council after winning 10 seats compared to 6 for the Liberal Democrats. Four new councillors were elected after the previous councillors stood down, while both the Conservative leader of the council Sean Woodward and the Liberal Democrat group leader Roger Price were re-elected. Overall turnout was high at 71.62% after the election was held at the same as the 2010 general election.

Ward results

Fareham East

Fareham North

Fareham North West

Fareham South

Fareham West

Hill Head

Locks Heath

Park Gate

Portchester East

Portchester West

Sarisbury

Stubbington

Titchfield

Titchfield Common

Warsash

References

2010
2010 English local elections
May 2010 events in the United Kingdom
2010s in Hampshire